Mary White College is a residential college at the University of New England (UNE), Australia, established in 1957.

The College was named after Mary White of Saumarez, a member of the Advisory Council of the then New England University College from its inception in 1938 until her death in 1948. Born in 1882, she was also noted as a photographer and woodcarver.

The College opened in March 1958, originally an all-girls college, though it has subsequently become co-educational. Blocks 1, 2 and 3 were fully completed by March 1959. A fourth block, with the Basement Common Room, was added in June, 1963 and a fifth block, with a new dining hall, was added in 1967. A further two blocks were built for the 1989 intake. Starting in 2010, in excess of $6 million in renovations have been completed on blocks 1, 2 and 3, as well as the common areas and Basement Common Room. The College currently provides accommodation for over 200 residents with a choice of several different rooms types. The College has its own commercial kitchen and dining hall.

Within the college system on the campus, Mary White College is the college situated closest to the University, being less than 100 metres to some lecture theatres. This also makes it the most popular with external students who attend residential schools, as they often do not have their own vehicles. People attending conferences and international delegates also are common at the College.

The College colours are green, white and black. The coat of arms, designed by Architect John Stephen Mansfield, has three white roses, a variation on the university's coat of arms, which has three red roses. The College's motto is "Ad Humanitatem", Latin for "Towards Human Understanding" or "For Humanity".

The College is involved in most extracurricular activities that UNE provides, including the President's Trophy and Mary Bagnall Trophy sporting competitions, and the Sir Frank Kitto cultural competition. The College also fields teams in club sports including hockey, netball, soccer and waterpolo.

The current Head of College is Ben Gooley. Some of the College's well-known Alumni include Dame Bridget Ogilvie AC DBE FRS, an Australian and British scientist, Milena Pires, an East Timorese politician and women's rights activist, who  has been the Permanent Representative of East Timor to the United Nations since 2016,  and Alice Glachan, Mayor of Albury.

References

External links 
 Mary White College website

Residential colleges of the University of New England (Australia)
Educational institutions established in 1956
1956 establishments in Australia